Novoarbatsky Bridge is a road bridge that crosses the Moskva river in Moscow. It is located between the Western (Kutuzovsky Prospekt) and Central Administrative Okrugs (Novy Arbat). It is one of the first bridges in Russia with an all-welded steel-reinforced concrete span and a roadway slab pressed with high-strength reinforcement.

See also
 List of bridges in Moscow

References

Bibliography
 

Bridges in Moscow
Steel bridges
Bridges completed in 1957
1957 establishments in Russia
Bridges built in the Soviet Union